Baker Boys (My Love, Your Desserts) is a 2021 Thai romantic comedy-drama television series starring Thanat Lowkhunsombat (Lee), Prachaya Ruangroj (Singto), Purim Rattanaruangwattana (Pluem) and Patara Eksangkul (Foei). Adapted from the manga series Antique Bakery by Fumi Yoshinaga, it tells the stories of four bakers who go through different challenges in life while on the baking industry. It's also the Thai version of the Japanese and South Korean franchises.

Directed by Pannares Ruchiranantal (Poy) and produced by GMMTV, this series is one of sixteen television series of GMMTV for 2021 during their "GMMTV 2021: The New Decade Begins" event on 3 December 2020. It is currently airing every Wednesday and Thursday at 20:30 (8:30 pm) on GMM25, and the streaming app AIS PLAY at 22:30 (10:30 pm), replacing the timeslot of reruns of Nabi, My Stepdarling. It was succeeded by 55:15 Never Too Late on its timeslot on GMM25.

Synopsis

Cast and characters

Main 
 Thanat Lowkhunsombat (Lee) as Punnapat "Punn" Detrachatanan / Manga character: Keiichiro Tachibana. He is the owner of the Sweet Day Cafe, the area that would eventually be the vital part of the child-abduction case
 Prachaya Ruangroj (Singto) as Warakron "Weir" Chanwanit / Manga character: Yūsuke Ono. He is a pastry chef that was hired by Punn in his new business. 
 Purim Rattanaruangwattana (Pluem) as Tadtep "Krathing" Udommana / Manga character: Eiji Kanda. He is a retired boxing player due to a medical condition that was hired by Punn in the café via a 3-month probation. 
 Patara Eksangkul (Foei) as Pooh / Manga character: Chikage Kobayakawa. A bodyguard of Punn that was falsely pointed out as one of the suspects in the kidnapping of the child by Krathing and Monet

Supporting 
Juthapich Indrajundra (Jamie) as Monet, an internet journalist who is investigating the child-abduction case along with her parents
 Oliver Pupart (An) as Manop, Monet's father who is also a reporter. 
 Apasiri Nitibhon (Um) as Rochi, Monet's mother who is also a reporter. 
 Athiwat Sanitwong Na Ayutthaya (Ton) as Chok
 Khoo Pei-Cong (Wave) as Jean
 Akkarin Akaranithimetrath (Joke) as Ted
 Kulteera Yordchang (Unda) as Piglet
 Phromphiriya Thongputtaruk (Papang) as Tum Tam
 Neen Suwanamas as Im-aim
 Ployphat Phatchatorn Thanawat as View
 Suratnawee Suwiporn (Bow) as Tiwa
 Sobee Chotirot Kaewpinit as Nuan
 Kalaya Lerdkasemsap (Ngek) as Weir's mom

Guests 
Thanaboon Wanlopsirinun (Na) as the host of the contest
Chatchawit Techarukpong (Victor) as Pob - Krating's boxing rival
Noppharnach Chaiwimol (Backaof)
Chinnarat Siriphongchawalit (Mike) as Noom - Weir's teacher

Reception

Thailand television ratings 
In the table below,  represents the lowest ratings and  represents the highest ratings.

 Based on the average audience share per episode.

International broadcast 
 Philippines – The series is one of the newest five GMMTV television series, alongside "Bad Buddy", "Not Me", "Enchanté", and "F4 Thailand: Boys Over Flowers" (a Thai adaptation of Meteor Garden, which had a different versions in Taiwan, Japan, South Korea and China, which was aired before on ABS-CBN) was acquired by ABS-CBN Corporation, after its successful acquisition of eight previous series under GMMTV. It was announced by Dreamscape Entertainment on 28 June 2021. Starting on 24 November 2021, all episodes with English subtitles will be made accessible for streaming on iWantTFC, in tandem with the Thailand broadcast. The streaming platform first released the Filipino-dubbed version for the first episode on 30 November 2021, with other episodes in succeeding dates.

References

External links 
 Baker Boys on GMM 25 website 
 Baker Boys on AIS Play
 
 GMMTV

2020s comedy-drama television series
2021 Thai television series debuts
2021 Thai television series endings
Television series by GMMTV
Thai romantic comedy television series